Chiriquí Occidente Fútbol Club is a Panamanian football team playing at the Liga Nacional de Ascenso. It is based in Puerto Armuelles, Chiriquí.

History
The club was created in 2010 as part of the Liga Nacional de Ascenso expansion project for the 2010–11 season.

References

Football clubs in Panama
Association football clubs established in 2010
2010 establishments in Panama
Chiriquí Province